Judith Maginnis Kuster, aka Judith A. Kuster, is a certified speech-language pathologist and Professor Emerita from Minnesota State University, Mankato where she taught in the Department of Speech, Hearing and Rehabilitation Services for 25 years. She holds an MS in speech-language pathology from the University of Wisconsin, Madison and an MS in counseling from Minnesota State University, Mankato. She is an ASHA FELLOW and a Board Recognized Specialist in Fluency  BRSF-R.

Kuster created and maintains the Stuttering Home Page, a guide and resources for professionals, adults and children about the treatment of stuttering, cluttering, and other communication disorders. She has been invited to give presentations about resources for the treatment of communications disorders North America, Europe, China, and Korea

Kuster organized and chaired ISAD Conference from 1998-2012.  ISAD is held on a yearly basis, for the three weeks before International Stuttering Awareness Day, every year.  International Stuttering Awareness Day is October 22.  This conference is free and available world-wide, connecting professionals (Speech-language pathologists and researchers) with consumers (people who stutter and their families). She also organized an International Cluttering Association online conference (  in 2010.

She has published many articles focused on speech-language pathology for the American Speech-Language-Hearing Association, Advance for Speech-Language Pathologists and Audiologists, the Journal of School Health, the Journal of Medical Speech-Language Pathology, The Clinical Connection, Speaking Out, and other journals.

Kuster lives in New Ulm, Minnesota with her husband Thomas Kuster.

ISAD Conferences 
The ISAD Conference is a yearly event and copies of the entire conference from 1998-2026 are archived.  Kuster has hosted the conference every year from 1998 to 2012.

2012, ISAD 15, A Voice and Something to Say
2011, ISAD 14, Sharing Stories - Changing Perceptions
2010, ISAD 13, People Who Stutter, INSPIRE!
2009, ISAD 12, STUTTERING: More Than a Tangled Tongue
2008, ISAD 11, Don't Be Afraid of Stuttering
2007, ISAD 10, Stuttering Awareness: Global Community, Local Activity
2006, ISAD 9, Don't Talk About Us, Talk With Us
2005, ISAD 8, Community Vision for Global Action
2004, ISAD 7, International Year of the Child Who Stutters
2003, ISAD 6, International Stuttering Awareness is Everyday
2002, ISAD 5, Don't Let Stuttering Stop You
2001, ISAD 4, You Are Not Alone
2000, ISAD 3, Reach Out to Children Who Stutter
1999, ISAD 2, Many Languages, One Voice
1998, ISAD 1, The Power of Your Voice

References

External links 
Stuttering Home Page

Living people
People from New Ulm, Minnesota
Speech and language pathologists
Year of birth missing (living people)
Minnesota State University, Mankato alumni
Minnesota State University, Mankato faculty
University of Wisconsin–Madison alumni